The XI Army Corps / XI AK was a corps level command of the Prussian and German Armies before and during World War I.

XI Corps was one of three formed in the aftermath of the Austro-Prussian War (the others being IX Corps and X Corps).  The Corps was formed in October 1866 with headquarters in Kassel.  The catchment area included the newly annexed Province of Hesse-Nassau and the Thuringian principalities (Saxe-Weimar, Saxe-Meiningen, Saxe-Coburg and Gotha and Waldeck).

During the Franco-Prussian War it was assigned to the 3rd Army.

The Corps was assigned to the VI Army Inspectorate but joined the predominantly Saxon 3rd Army at the start of the First World War.  It was still in existence at the end of the war in the 6th Army, Heeresgruppe Kronprinz Rupprecht on the Western Front.  The Corps was disbanded with the demobilisation of the German Army after World War I.

Franco-Prussian War 
During the Franco-Prussian War, the corps formed part of the 3rd Army.  It participated in the battles of Wissembourg, Wörth and Sedan.

Between the wars 
Initially, the Corps commanded the 21st Division in Frankfurt and the 22nd Division in Kassel.  In 1871 they were joined by the Grand Ducal Hessian 25th Division in Darmstadt.  As the German Army expanded in the latter part of the 19th Century, a new XVIII Corps was formed on 1 April 1899 and took command of the 21st and 25th Divisions.  The 38th Division was formed at Erfurt on the same date and joined the Corps.

The Corps was assigned to the VI Army Inspectorate but joined the predominantly Saxon 3rd Army at the start of the First World War.

Peacetime organisation 
The 25 peacetime Corps of the German Army (Guards, I - XXI, I - III Bavarian) had a reasonably standardised organisation.  Each consisted of two divisions with usually two infantry brigades, one field artillery brigade and a cavalry brigade each.  Each brigade normally consisted of two regiments of the appropriate type, so each Corps normally commanded 8 infantry, 4 field artillery and 4 cavalry regiments.  There were exceptions to this rule:
V, VI, VII, IX and XIV Corps each had a 5th infantry brigade (so 10 infantry regiments)
II, XIII, XVIII and XXI Corps had a 9th infantry regiment
I, VI and XVI Corps had a 3rd cavalry brigade (so 6 cavalry regiments)
the Guards Corps had 11 infantry regiments (in 5 brigades) and 8 cavalry regiments (in 4 brigades).
Each Corps also directly controlled a number of other units.  This could include one or more
Foot Artillery Regiment
Jäger Battalion
Pioneer Battalion
Train Battalion

World War I

Organisation on mobilisation 
On mobilization on 2 August 1914 the Corps was restructured.  38th Cavalry Brigade was withdrawn to form part of the 8th Cavalry Division and the 22nd Cavalry Brigade was withdrawn to form part of the 3rd Cavalry Division.  The 6th Cuirassiers, formerly of the III Corps, was raised to a strength of 6 squadrons before being split into two half-regiments of 3 squadrons each.  The half-regiments were assigned as divisional cavalry to 22nd and 38th Divisions.  Divisions received engineer companies and other support units from the Corps headquarters.  In summary, XI Corps mobilised with 25 infantry battalions, 9 machine gun companies (54 machine guns), 6 cavalry squadrons, 24 field artillery batteries (144 guns), 4 heavy artillery batteries (16 guns), 3 pioneer companies and an aviation detachment.

Combat chronicle 
The Corps was assigned to the VI Army Inspectorate in peacetime but joined the predominantly Saxon 3rd Army at the start of the First World War forming part of the right wing of the forces for the Schlieffen Plan offensive in August 1914 on the Western Front.  It participated in the capture of Namur and was immediately transferred to the Eastern Front to join the 8th Army in time to participate in the First Battle of the Masurian Lakes.  It was then transferred to the 9th Army and took part in the Battle of the Vistula River.

It returned to the Western Front at the end of 1915.

It was still in existence at the end of the war in the 6th Army, Heeresgruppe Kronprinz Rupprecht on the Western Front.

Commanders 
The XI Corps had the following commanders during its existence:

See also 

Franco-Prussian War order of battle
German Army order of battle (1914)
German Army order of battle, Western Front (1918)
List of Imperial German infantry regiments
List of Imperial German artillery regiments
List of Imperial German cavalry regiments

References

Bibliography 
 
 
 
 
 

Corps of Germany in World War I
Military units and formations established in 1866
Military units and formations disestablished in 1919